Caladenia longicauda subspecies borealis, commonly known as daddy-long-legs spider orchid is a plant in the orchid family Orchidaceae and is endemic to the south-west of Western Australia. It has a single hairy leaf and up to three mostly white flowers with long, drooping sepals and petals.

Description
It is usually solitary but sometimes grows in small clumps, flowering between July and September. The flowers are mostly white except for a few red markings and reddish stripes on the backs of the petals and sepals. The middle part of the labellum has the longest teeth on its edge, the teeth red with hooked white tips. The front part of the labellum curves downwards, with the teeth becoming shorter. The fruit is a non-fleshy, dehiscent capsule containing a large number of seeds. Flowering occurs from July to September.

Taxonomy and naming
In 2001, Stephen Hopper and Andrew Brown published a review of the genus Caladenia in the journal Nuytsia and described eleven subspecies of Caladenia longicauda including subspecies borealis. (Three new subspecies have since been added.) The name borealis is derived from a Latin word boreas meaning "northern".

Distribution and habitat
Daddy-long-legs spider orchid is relatively widespread and locally common, usually growing in sandy, well-drained soil in wandoo woodland, near creeks, in sheoak groves and Acacia thickets between Cataby and the Murchison River in the Avon Wheatbelt, Geraldton Sandplains, Jarrah Forest and Swan Coastal Plain biogeographic regions.

Conservation
Caladenia longicauda subsp. borealis is classified as "Not Threatened" by the Western Australian Government Department of Parks and Wildlife.

References

longicauda subsp. borealis
Orchids of Western Australia
Endemic orchids of Australia
Plants described in 2001
Endemic flora of Western Australia
Taxa named by Stephen Hopper
Taxa named by Andrew Phillip Brown